Mike Kellar is an American football coach and former player. He is the 25th head football coach at Glenville State College in Glenville, West Virginia, a position he had held since 2019. Kellar previously served as the head football coach at Concord University in Athens, West Virginia (2009–2010), California University of Pennsylvania (2012–2015), and Lenoir–Rhyne University in Hickory, North Carolina (2016–2017).

Head coaching record

References

External links
 Glenville State profile

Year of birth missing (living people)
Living people
American football quarterbacks
California Vulcans football coaches
Concord Mountain Lions football coaches
Glenville State Pioneers football coaches
Glenville State Pioneers football players
Fairmont State Fighting Falcons football players
Lenoir–Rhyne Bears football coaches
Northern Michigan Wildcats football coaches
West Liberty Hilltoppers football coaches
West Virginia University alumni